Ridin' Wild is a 1925 American silent Western film directed by Leon De La Mothe a written by Robert J. Horner and Matilda Smith featuring William Barrymore. The film was shot on location in Tucson, Arizona in 1924.  An 8mm print of the Film was acquired by the Tucson Historic Preservation Foundation and digitized and restored in 2011.  The film features the first 1924 Tucson Winter Rodeo: La Fiesta de los Vaqueros.

This Western starred William Barrymore who, despite his intentionally misleading surname, was not a member of the great acting clan. He was, in fact, Elia Bulakh, a former Cossack soldier in the army of Czar Nicholas II who had escaped execution during the revolution of 1917 by using the lid of a can of beef (which was supposed to be his last meal) to slit the throat of his executioner and escape from Russia to the United States via China.

Plot
Kit Carson travels to Tucson thinking the desert air will help his health. After accidentally meeting cowboy Jack Richardson he learns the ways of the west. But after meeting Pauline Curley, Kit hears of Richardson’s evil ways. With high stakes in the upcoming Tucson rodeo, Richardson kidnaps Kit to prevent him from competing. This 1925 silent western showcases Tucson and the surrounding area in remarkable detail. A surviving print of the film was tracked down by historian Demion Clinco, acquired and digitized by the Tucson Historic Preservation Foundation  Live piano accompaniment in conjunction with the Tucson Jazz Festival thanks to Jeff Haskell. The film was screened in 2016 as part of the Tucson Film Fest with live musical accompaniment.

Cast
 William Barrymore as Jim Warren (As Kit Carson)
 Pauline Curley as Betty Blake
 Jack Richardson as Scarface Jordan
 Jack Walker as George Berge
 Walter Maly as Sheriff Fred Blake
 C.L. James as Red Hanson
 Robert J. Horner Producer
 Jack Draper Cinematography
 Nathan Hirsh Presenter and co-producer

References

1925 films
1925 Western (genre) films
American black-and-white films
Films shot in Arizona
Films shot in Tucson, Arizona
Films directed by Leon De La Mothe
Silent American Western (genre) films
1920s American films
1920s English-language films